St. Paul was a provincial electoral district in Alberta, Canada, mandated to return a single member to the Legislative Assembly of Alberta from 1913 to 1993.

Boundary history
When created in 1913, the riding contained all the farmland north of the North Saskatchewan River and east of Lac La Biche, corresponding approximately to the current Bonnyville-Cold Lake-St. Paul riding. In 1952 the riding was split in half, creating the riding of Bonnyville and leaving St. Paul with approximately the same boundaries as the County of St. Paul No. 19 until abolished in 1993.

Representation history

The first MLA for St. Paul was Prosper-Edmond Lessard, who had already served one term as MLA for the short-lived Pakan district with the government Liberals. In 1921, with the fall of the Liberal government, he was defeated by Laudas Joly of the United Farmers of Alberta.

After two terms, Joly was defeated by Liberal Joseph Miville Dechene. He served one term as MLA before the Social Credit sweep in 1935. The party would hold St. Paul for all 36 years they formed government, with Joseph Beaudry serving for four terms and Raymond Reierson serving for five.

In 1971, the Progressive Conservatives came to power, and Mick Fluker captured St. Paul for the new government. He retired after two terms. Charles Anderson kept the riding for the PC's in the 1979 election, and retired after only one term.

PC John Drobot served as MLA for the next three terms until the riding was abolished in 1993. He did not run in the new riding of Lac La Biche-St. Paul, which was captured by the Liberals.

Election results

1910s

1920s

In 1926, Alberta began to use the instant-runoff system to elect MLAs in rural districts.

1930s

|-
!colspan=6|Second round

|colspan=2|Neither
|align=right|433

Second-round swing reflects increase in vote share from the first round. Overall swing is calculated from first preferences.

1940s

|-
!colspan=6|Second round

|colspan=2|Neither
|align=right|486

First-round swing is calculated from first preferences in the 1935 election. The independent vote share is compared to the Liberal share in 1935. See Unity Coalition.

|-
!colspan=6|Second round

|colspan=2|Neither
|align=right|588

|-
!colspan=6|Second round

|colspan=2|Neither
|align=right|559

1950s
St. Paul was split for the 1952 election, with the northeastern half of the riding becoming the district of Bonnyville. Former St. Paul MLA Laudas Joly became its first representative.

Alberta reverted to traditional first past the post elections beginning in 1959. This can be seen in the dramatic drop in spoiled (incorrectly marked) ballots compared to previous elections.

1960s

1970s

1980s

Plebiscite results

1957 liquor plebiscite

On October 30, 1957 a stand-alone plebiscite was held province wide in all 50 of the then current provincial electoral districts in Alberta. The government decided to consult Alberta voters to decide on liquor sales and mixed drinking after a divisive debate in the Legislature. The plebiscite was intended to deal with the growing demand for reforming antiquated liquor control laws.

The plebiscite was conducted in two parts. Question A asked in all districts, asked the voters if the sale of liquor should be expanded in Alberta, while Question B asked in a handful of districts within the corporate limits of Calgary and Edmonton asked if men and woman were allowed to drink together in establishments.

Province wide Question A of the plebiscite passed in 33 of the 50 districts while Question B passed in all five districts. St. Paul voted in favour of the proposal by a solid majority. Voter turnout in the district was abysmal falling well under the province wide average of 46%.

Official district returns were released to the public on December 31, 1957. The Social Credit government in power at the time did not considered the results binding. However the results of the vote led the government to repeal all existing liquor legislation and introduce an entirely new Liquor Act.

Municipal districts lying inside electoral districts that voted against the Plebiscite were designated Local Option Zones by the Alberta Liquor Control Board and considered effective dry zones, business owners that wanted a license had to petition for a binding municipal plebiscite in order to be granted a license.

See also
List of Alberta provincial electoral districts
St. Paul, Alberta, a town in east-central Alberta, Canada, within the County of St. Paul No. 19

References

Further reading

External links
Elections Alberta
The Legislative Assembly of Alberta

Former provincial electoral districts of Alberta